The King of Prussia Transit Center is a major bus terminal located at the King of Prussia mall in King of Prussia, Pennsylvania for SEPTA buses. The transit center serves SEPTA Suburban Division buses traveling to Center City Philadelphia via Route 124 or Route 125, Chesterbrook via Route 124, Valley Forge via Route 125,  69th Street station via Route 123, the Norristown Transportation Center and Phoenixville via Route 99, the West Chester Transportation Center via Route 92, and Limerick via Route 139.

Location and layout
The King of Prussia Transit Center is located at the King of Prussia mall next to the former JCPenney. A mall entrance adjacent to the transit center provides access to the lower level. The transit center has an interior waiting area attached to the former JCPenney that has seating, a vending machine, SEPTA Key Fare Kiosks, bus schedules, and a system map. The interior waiting area is accessible 24 hours a day. Additional bus shelters are located along the sidewalk running parallel to the roadway serving the transit center.

Services

The King of Prussia Transit Center is served by six SEPTA Suburban Division bus routes. The Route 92 bus provides service Monday to Saturday from the transit center to the West Chester Transportation Center in West Chester. The Route 99 bus provides daily service to the Norristown Transportation Center in Norristown and to Phoenixville. A few Route 99 trips only run between the Norristown Transportation Center and the King of Prussia Transit center. The Route 123 bus runs daily from the transit center to the 69th Street Transportation Center in Upper Darby, providing express service. The Route 124 bus provides daily service to Center City Philadelphia and to Chesterbrook, with express service between Center City Philadelphia and Gulph Mills. Some Route 124 trips only run between Center City Philadelphia and the transit center. The Route 125 bus runs daily to Center City Philadelphia and to Valley Forge, running express between Center City Philadelphia and Gulph Mills. Some Route 125 trips only run between Center City Philadelphia and the transit center. The Route 139 bus provides service Monday to Saturday from the transit center to Limerick.

References

External links

SEPTA stations and terminals
Transportation buildings and structures in Montgomery County, Pennsylvania
Upper Merion Township, Montgomery County, Pennsylvania